Cabo da Ribeira is a settlement in the eastern part of the island of Santo Antão, Cape Verde. In 2010 its population was 912. It is situated at about 500 m elevation in the upper valley of the Ribeira do Paul, 5 km southwest of Pombas. It is part of the municipality of Paul, and lies in the Cova-Paul-Ribeira da Torre Natural Park.

See also
List of villages and settlements in Cape Verde

References

Villages and settlements in Santo Antão, Cape Verde
Paul, Cape Verde
Cova-Paul-Ribeira da Torre Natural Park